Les Scadding is an English former mechanic who acquired media attention as the winner of £45,500,000 on the EuroMillions lottery in 2009, aged 53. 
Following his win, he invested a portion of the money in becoming the major shareholder of Newport County A.F.C., and acted as the club's chairman between 2012 and 2015.

Biography

Born in Bristol, Scadding and his first wife Rose-Marie had three children. At the time of his lottery win, Scadding had for some time been resident in Newport, Wales, where he lived with his second wife and co-lottery winner, Samantha Peachey-Scadding. 
Scadding had been unemployed for a year before buying the winning ticket, and had overcome testicular cancer five years earlier.

In June 2009, Scadding and his wife won £45.5 million through the lottery EuroMillions. At that time aged 53, his wife 38, Scadding gave each of his three children from his first marriage an undisclosed seven-figure sum, but did not share any with their mother.

Television
In August 2014, Scadding presented a four-part TV series for ITV featuring Welsh lottery winners, titled "The Welsh Millionaires Club".

Newport County

In August 2012, Scadding succeeded Chris Blight as the chairman of Newport County A.F.C., shortly after accepting an offer to join their board of directors. Just over eight months after he took the position, Newport defeated fellow Welsh club Wrexham in the 2013 Conference Premier play-off Final to gain promotion to the Football League following a 25-year absence under manager Justin Edinburgh.

On 18 June 2015, Scadding resigned his positions as both the chairman and a director at Newport County. It was later reported that Scadding wished to spend more time at his holiday home in Barbados. On 1 October 2015 Newport County Supporters' Trust took over ownership of the club.

References

Living people
People from Bristol
People from Newport, Wales
English football chairmen and investors
British expatriates in Barbados
Lottery winners
Year of birth missing (living people)